Mount Ida High School is a public six-year high school located in Mount Ida, Arkansas, United States. Mount Ida is one of three public high schools in Montgomery County and the only high school of the Mount Ida School District. For 2010–11, the school enrollment was 256 students occupying grades 7 through 12.

Academics
The assumed course of study follows the Smart Core curriculum developed by the Arkansas Department of Education (ADE). Students complete regular (core and career focus) courses and exams and may select Advanced Placement (AP) coursework and exams that provide an opportunity for college credit. The school is accredited by the ADE.

Athletics 
The Mount Ida team mascot and athletic emblem is the Lion with maroon and white serving as the school colors.

For 2012–14, the Mount Ida Lions participate in the 2A Classification from the 2A Region 4 Conference, as administered by the Arkansas Activities Association. The Lions compete football, golf (boys/girls), basketball (boys/girls), cheer, dance, baseball, softball, and track and field (boys/girls).

References

External links
 

Public high schools in Arkansas
Schools in Montgomery County, Arkansas